Inverinate  is a small linear village on the north shore of Loch Duich in Lochalsh, Scottish Highlands and is in the Scottish council area of Highland.

History
A prominent family of tacksmen of Clan Macrae were based for several centuries at Inverinate. They were loyal followers of the Earls of Seaforth and included Chamberlains of Kintail, castellans of Eilean Donan, clergymen and poets (such as Donnchadh MacRath) and Iain mac Mhurchaidh.

References

External link

Populated places in Lochalsh
Clan Macrae